The Black Doll is a 1938 American mystery film directed by Otis Garrett and starring Donald Woods and Edgar Kennedy. The film was the second in Universal's Crime Club series following The Westland Case.

Production
In 1937, Universal Pictures made a deal with Crime Club, who were publishers of whodunnits. Over the next few years Universal released several mystery films in the series. The film was the second in Universal's Crime Club series following The Westland Case. The Black Doll was based on the novel The Black Doll by William Edward Hayes.

Release
The Black Doll was distributed by Universal Pictures on January 30, 1938. The film was followed with eight more films in the Crime Club series in the next two years.

Reception
From contemporary reviews, Wanda Hale of The New York Daily News described the film as "an absorbing mystery story" that will "stir your admiration, wrack your nerves, tickle your funny bone and, if you don't watch out, deflate your pride in your sleuthing ability." The Film Daily declared the film as "a combination of suspenseful mystery and comedy that furnishes a lot of laughs makes this an enjoyable murder picture of the regular program variety." The Hollywood Reporter found that the Crime Club series "cannot make up its mind whether to be a mystery or a farce. Harold Buckley's screenplay is excellent, but it is difficult to understand how the presence of low comedy, which borders on actual farce, can be justified by a director in a picture dealing with murder."

References

Footnotes

Sources

External links
The Black Doll at TCMDB
The Black Doll at IMDb

1938 films
American mystery films
1938 mystery films
American black-and-white films
Films directed by Otis Garrett
Universal Pictures films
1930s English-language films
1930s American films